Eric William Hurley (born September 17, 1985) is an American former professional baseball pitcher. He played in Major League Baseball (MLB) for the Texas Rangers in 2008.

Career

High school
Hurley attended Samuel W. Wolfson High School in Jacksonville, Florida, where he was teammates with fellow first round draft pick Billy Butler who was selected by the Kansas City Royals.

Texas Rangers
Hurley was drafted in 2004 by the Texas Rangers and was their Minor League Pitcher of the Year in 2006. He made his major league debut on June 12, against the Kansas City Royals, pitching 6 innings but earning a no decision. Hurley earned his first major league victory on June 29, 2008, against the Philadelphia Phillies, giving up only one earned run over 5.2 innings.

Hurley missed the 2009 season after undergoing surgery for a torn rotator cuff before the season. In 2011, he missed starts due to a viral infection, and while he was out, fellow pitcher Neil Ramirez took his place.

Los Angeles Angels of Anaheim
Hurley signed a minor league contract with the Los Angeles Angels of Anaheim on December 23. On July 6, 2012, he had his contract purchased by the Angels. Before appearing in any games, he was sent back to Triple-A and removed from the 40-man roster. After clearing waivers on July 20, he elected free agency.

Minnesota Twins
On July 24, 2012, Hurley signed a minor league contract with the Minnesota Twins.

References

External links

1985 births
Living people
Baseball players from Jacksonville, Florida
People from Sikeston, Missouri
Baseball players from Missouri
Major League Baseball pitchers
Texas Rangers players
Arizona League Rangers players
Spokane Indians players
Clinton LumberKings players
Bakersfield Blaze players
Frisco RoughRiders players
Oklahoma RedHawks players
Round Rock Express players
Salt Lake Bees players
Rochester Red Wings players
Surprise Rafters players